Liverpool Street  is a street in the central business district of Sydney in New South Wales, Australia.

Liverpool Street runs east-west in the southern portion of the central business district and forms the southern boundary of Hyde Park. At Elizabeth Street traffic flows in a westerly direction only towards its western terminus at Darling Harbour. From Elizabeth Street in an easterly direction, traffic flows both east and west where it reaches a major intersection at Whitlam Square before continuing as a minor suburban street through East Sydney and Darlinghurst, terminating at Boundary Street.

Developments
The Downing Centre (that formerly housed department store Mark Foy's Piazza Store) is a major court house complex on Liverpool Street, between Elizabeth Street and Castlereagh Street.

World Square is a large commercial and residential development which takes up a whole block, bounded by Liverpool Street, George Street, Goulburn Street and Pitt Street. It features a shopping centre, hotel, office buildings and apartment towers. Liverpool Lane, off Liverpool Street, is part of World Square and features restaurants, cafés and take away shops.

Amongst the dining options available along Liverpool Street, there is an abundance of Spanish restaurants. The area has therefore gained recognition as Sydney's "Spanish Quarter".

Transport

The main entrance to Museum railway station is located on the corner of Liverpool street and Elizabeth Street. Other entrances and subways in Liverpool Street near the Downing Centre, provide links to the station.

Gallery

See also

Lanes and alleyways of Sydney

References

External links